The Oldwick Historic District is a  national historic district located along County Route 517 (Main Street), Church, King, James, Joliet and William streets in the Oldwick section of Tewksbury Township in Hunterdon County, New Jersey. The district was added to the National Register of Historic Places on November 14, 1988, for its significance in architecture, commerce, and industry. It includes 127 contributing buildings, 12 contributing structures, and one contributing site. The Kline Farmhouse, listed individually in 1984, also contributes to the district. Many of the buildings were documented by the Historic American Buildings Survey.

History
In the 1740s, Ralph Smith bought land in the northern part of Oldwick. The Zion Lutheran Church was built in 1749 and remodeled in 1831 using vernacular Gothic/Greek Revival style. The Tewksbury Inn was built in 1800 with Colonial Revival embellishment. The Oldwick Methodist Church was built in 1865 with Romanesque Revival style.

Gallery of contributing properties
Selected properties that are pivotal, that is, the most important to the district in terms of architecture or history, as described by the nomination form.

References

External links
 
 
 
 
 
 
 
 
 
 

Tewksbury Township, New Jersey
National Register of Historic Places in Hunterdon County, New Jersey
Historic districts on the National Register of Historic Places in New Jersey
New Jersey Register of Historic Places
Georgian architecture in New Jersey
Victorian architecture in New Jersey
Historic American Buildings Survey in New Jersey